Drapers' Hall is a historic building (Grade II* listed) in the Cathedral Quarter of Coventry built in 1832 by the Drapers' Company, a large trading guild in Coventry. 
The present building is believed to the third guildhall on the site.

History 
Drapers' Hall was constructed 1831-32 to be the headquarters of the Coventry Drapers' Guild, and an east wing was added in 1864.

The basement of the building was used as an air raid shelter for 200 people during the Second World War.

It was also used as a church centre. In 2012 it was reported that the building would be converted into a music centre.

Architecture 
The building is built in Greek Revival style and was designed by Thomas Rickman and Henry Hutchinson.

Access 
The building has been opened to the public under the auspices of the Heritage Open Days scheme.

See also
Grade II* listed buildings in Coventry
 St Mary's Guildhall

External links

References 

Buildings and structures in Coventry
Grade II* listed buildings in the West Midlands (county)
Commercial buildings completed in 1832
Guildhalls in the United Kingdom
Greek Revival architecture in the United Kingdom
Neoclassical architecture in England